Paul Heron Robinson Jr. (born June 22, 1930) is a United States businessman who was United States Ambassador to Canada from 1981 to 1985.

Biography
Robinson was born in Chicago on June 22, 1930.  He attended Hinsdale Township High School in Hinsdale, Illinois. After graduating from high school, Robinson attended the University of Illinois, receiving a B.S. in 1953. Robinson served in the United States Navy from 1953 to 1955, achieving the rank of Lieutenant. He later founded his own business, Robinson, Incorporated, working as a broker for banks and professional institutions.  He was also an active member of the Republican Party.

In 1981, President of the United States Ronald Reagan nominated Robinson to be United States Ambassador to Canada.  Robinson presented his credentials on July 15, 1981, and served in Ottawa until September 9, 1985.  He began discussions with the Liberal government headed by Prime Minister of Canada Pierre Trudeau about easing trade restrictions between the U.S. and Canada.  With the election of Progressive Conservative Brian Mulroney in the 1984 Canadian federal election, these talks were expanded to discussions about a comprehensive free trade agreement.  These discussions were the starting point of a process that would ultimately see the signing of the Canada – United States Free Trade Agreement on October 4, 1988.

References
Paul H. Robinson, Jr., "Good Business For Good Neighbors", Chicago Tribune, Oct. 26, 1988

1930 births
Living people
Ambassadors of the United States to Canada
Businesspeople from Chicago
University of Illinois alumni
United States Navy officers
Illinois Republicans
Military personnel from Illinois